Olszewice may refer to the following places:
Olszewice, Kuyavian-Pomeranian Voivodeship (north-central Poland)
Olszewice, Łódź Voivodeship (central Poland)
Olszewice, Masovian Voivodeship (east-central Poland)